Sahibzada Muhammad Ameer Sultan is a Pakistani politician who had been a member of the National Assembly of Pakistan from August 2018 till January 2023.

Early life 

Ameer Sultan was born on March 22, 1976, as the son of  Muhammad Nazir Sultan. He spent most of his childhood in Lahore, and grew up with a political family. He graduated from the University of Pennsylvania with a Master’s Degree in Law in 2002. 

He has a son named Sahibzada Muhammad Ibrahim Sultan.

Political career

He was elected to the National Assembly of Pakistan from Constituency NA-116 (Jhang-III) as a candidate of Pakistan Tehreek-e-Insaf in 2018 Pakistani general election.

In November 2018, he was appointed Federal Parliamentary Secretary for National Food Security and Research.

References

External Link

More Reading

 List of members of the 15th National Assembly of Pakistan

Living people
Pakistani MNAs 2018–2023
1976 births